Marval is a French commune.

Marval may also refer to:

Companies 
 Marval (publisher), French publishing house

People
 Adolphe Emile Marval ( 1845–1935), French-born teacher and art dealer in South Australia
 Alice Marval, (1865–1904), English doctor and nurse in Cawnpore (presently Kanpur, India)
 Jacqueline Marval, real name Marie Josephine Vallet (1866-1932), French artist
 Rocky Marval (born Rocco Marvaldi in 1965), American skater